This is a list of lighting design software for use in analyzing photometrics, BIM (Building Information Modeling), and 3D modeling.  The software is typically used by importing the structural design via CAD files.  Then lighting elements are inserted.  And finally, the lighting objects are associated with a photometry via IES files. The photometry of a light fixture describes the way it distributes its light into space. Once this process is completed, the illuminance and luminance produced by each fixture in the space can be calculated. The output is typically a diagram indicating these by means of colors or numbers. This typically is the goal of technical photometry software.
 
In marketing and higher-level design, 3D photometric analysis is useful to give a graphical (no numerics) output of a proposed design.
 
Open source
 Radiance
 
Proprietary
 AGi32
AutoLUX (AutoCAD extension)
 Calculux
 DIALux
 DL-Light (Daylighting, Sketchup extension)
 FocusTrack
 LightStanza
 LITESTAR 4D
 RELUX
 Speos
 TracePro
 Ulysse
 Visual
 Wysiwyg (CAST software)
 
Lighting
Computer-aided design software
Architectural lighting design

References

Lighting
Computer-aided design software
Architectural lighting design